The 1963 Kentucky Wildcats football team were an American football team that represented the University of Kentucky as a member of the Southeastern Conference during the 1963 NCAA University Division football season. In their second season under head coach Charlie Bradshaw, the team compiled a 3–6–1 record (0–5–1 in the SEC).

Schedule

References

Kentucky
Kentucky Wildcats football seasons
Kentucky Wildcats football